Groupe du Louvre is a French company, headquartered in Village 5, La Défense in Nanterre, France. Groupe du Louvre and Louvre Hotels Group was sold to Shanghai Jin Jiang International Hotels Development Co., Ltd. in 2015. The company was owned by the American investment company Starwood Capital Group,  following its earlier purchase of Société du Louvre in December 2005. The range of hotel brands was extended in 2009 with the purchase of Golden Tulip Hospitality Group.

Hospitality

Louvre Group owns the European hotel brands Première Classe (1 star), Campanile (2-3 stars), Kyriad (2-3 stars), Kyriad Prestige (3 stars), Tulip Inn (3 stars), Golden Tulip (4 stars), and Royal Tulip (5 stars). Since 2009, the Golden Tulip hotels were integrated into the group following their purchase of Golden Tulip Hospitality Group from administration by Starwood Capital.

The luxury hotels division (previously known as Société du Louvre) can trace its origins to a company founded on 26 March 1855 to operate Les Galeries du Louvre, later Grands Magasins du Louvre, a department store and the Grand Hôtel du Louvre. These shared a large building on the Place du Palais Royal in Paris, France.
The division is managed by the Societe Concorde Management Company, a subsidiary of the group trading under the Concorde Hotels & Resorts brand, with locations around the world.

The group previously owned the Paris Hôtel de Crillon but sold it at the end of 2010.

Products
The group is the majority shareholder of Baccarat, a crystal manufacturer. Starwood Capital, through its subsidiary SH Group has launched the luxury Baccarat Hotels.

The company sold the perfume firm Annick Goutal to the South Korean giant Amore Pacific in 2011.

References

External links 

 Group du Louvre (archived 20 May 2012)
 Louvre Hotels Group (archived 21 September 2012)
 

Companies based in Île-de-France
Hospitality companies of France
Louvre Hotels